Dave Armstrong (born May 10, 1957 in Detroit, Michigan) is an American television sports announcer for professional and college sports. He spent nine years as the play-by-play announcer for two Major League Baseball teams (Kansas City Royals and Colorado Rockies), in the NFL he has worked with both the Seattle Seahawks and the Kansas City Chiefs broadcasting regular and pre-season games and also announced several games for the NBA’s Denver Nuggets. He broadcasts Big 12 college basketball games for ESPN Regional Television and Big 12 Now and has been calling games in this conference since 1988. His signature “Wow!” is known as the exclamation mark on exceptional plays.

Career
Armstrong graduated with a B.A. in Broadcasting from John Brown University and began his career working in radio and television in the Midwest. He served as the Program Director for KKOY (AM)/FM in Chanute, KS before moving to KAYS-TV in Hays, KS then on to KSNW-TV in Wichita as the Sports Director. During his time with KSNW-TV, he began doing play-by-play for professional soccer and many collegiate sports. In 1988, Armstrong’s sports broadcasting career took off when he joined Raycom Sports to do play-by-play for Big 8 (now the Big 12) college basketball. He eventually added nearly every college sport to his list of professional credits: Football, Baseball, Wrestling, Volleyball, Tennis and Track and Field. Armstrong also calls the televised games on the Jayhawk Network for the Kansas Jayhawks (1993–present). He has done play-by-play for ESPN, Prime Network, Fox Sports and the American Sports Network calling games in the Big 12, the Big East, the Big Ten and the ACC.

His professional sports credentials include three seasons as the television voice of Major League Baseball’s Kansas City Royals (1993–1995) followed by six seasons with the Colorado Rockies (1996–2001). Rounding out his experience in professional sports, he has done play-by-play in the NFL (Seattle Seahawks in 1992 and the Kansas City Chiefs in 2009) as well as in the NBA, filling in during the 1996 - 2001 seasons with the Denver Nuggets. Armstrong is a member of the National Sportscasters and Sportswriters Association.

Armstrong retired from broadcasting on November 28, 2022; the last event he called was an 87-55 victory by Kansas over Texas Southern in men's college basketball.

Other Work
In addition to his sports announcing work, Armstrong is also an author and speaker. His book, “Driving From Here to Wow: Looking at Life Through the Windshield” (2008), is an inspirational and humorous account of many of his life experiences – both personal and professional. Armstrong also frequently emcees for corporate and charitable events throughout the country, speaks at youth sports camps, does commercial voice work for documentaries and provides the voice for promotional videos developed for corporations and trade associations.

References

External links 
 Kansas City Royals All-Time Broadcasters Lowe's Senior Class Award Article

1957 births
Living people
American television sports announcers
Big 12 Conference
College basketball announcers in the United States
College football announcers
Colorado Rockies announcers
Denver Nuggets announcers
John Brown University alumni
Kansas City Chiefs announcers
Kansas City Royals announcers
Kansas Jayhawks basketball
Major League Baseball broadcasters
National Basketball Association broadcasters
National Football League announcers
Television personalities from Detroit
Seattle Seahawks announcers
Women's college basketball announcers in the United States
Major Indoor Soccer League (1978–1992) commentators